The Republic of the Rif (Tarifit: Tagduda n Arrif,  Jumhūriyya ar-Rīf), officially The Rifian People's Democratic Republic, also known simply as the Rif, was a confederate republic in the Rif, a region in northern Morocco, that existed between 1921 and 1926. It was created in September 1921, when the local people of the area revolted, declaring their independence from Spanish colonization, as well as from Sultan Yusef. The French would intervene on the side of Spain in the later stages of the conflict. The Rif was the last sovereign republic in Morocco to date. A protracted struggle for independence killed many Riffians and Spanish–French soldiers, and witnessed the use of chemical weapons by the Spanish army—their first widespread deployment since the end of the Great War. The eventual Spanish–French victory was owed to the technological and manpower advantages enjoyed by the colonizers, in spite of their lack of morale and coherence.  Following the war's end, the Rif Republic was ultimately dissolved in 1926.

History

In 1921, local Rifians, under the leadership of Abd el-Krim, crushed a Spanish offensive led by General Manuel Fernández Silvestre at the Battle of Annual, and soon after declared the creation of an independent republic on 18 September 1921. The republic was formally constituted in 1923, with Abd el-Krim as head of state, and Ben Hajj Hatmi as prime minister.

El-Krim handed the Spanish numerous defeats, driving them back to coastal outposts. With the war ongoing, he sent diplomatic representatives to London and Paris, in an ultimately futile attempt to establish legitimate diplomatic relations with other European powers.

In late 1925, the French and Spanish created a joint task force of 500,000 men, supported by tanks and aircraft. After 1923, the Spanish employed the use of chemical weapons imported from Germany. The Republic was dissolved by Spanish and French occupation forces on 27 May 1926, but many Rif guerrillas continued to fight until 1927.

See also
Rif War (1920)
Chemical weapons in the Rif War

References

1921 establishments in Africa
1926 disestablishments
Rif
Rif
Rif
Rif
Republicanism in Morocco
Berber history
Separatism in Morocco
Rif
States and territories established in 1921
States and territories disestablished in 1926
Morocco–Spain relations
Former countries of the interwar period
Islamic states
Former countries